Pecorino toscano (Tuscan pecorino) is a firm-textured ewe's milk cheese produced in Tuscany. Since 1996 it has enjoyed protected designation of origin (PDO) status.

History
Pliny the Elder, in his major encyclopædic work Naturalis Historia, describes several stages in the production of pecorino toscano, which he names as Lunense, apparently after the territory of Lunigiana. Other early names of the cheese include "marzolino", after the month of March in which production traditionally began.

In 1475 the writer Bartolomeo Platina said that the Etruscan marzolino was as good as Parmesan cheese: "In Italy there are two types of cheese that compete for the first place: marzolino, so called by the Etruscans because it is made in Etruria in March, and Parmesan cheese, from the Cisalpine region, that is also known as maggengo, because it is produced in May (maggio in Italian)".

Today, this style of pecorino is widely produced across Tuscany and also in several nearer districts of Umbria and Lazio.

Production
This ranks the cheese as the third-highest sheep's cheese in Italy, the largest being pecorino romano and pecorino sardo.

Description
The cheese is prepared with full cream, pasteurised ewe's milk, often by farm-based cheese producers.

The cheese is ready to be eaten after a maturation period of just twenty days.   However, it is generally regarded as a hard cheese, frequently used for grating, and to achieve this characteristic hard texture, the cheese should be left alone for at least four months.

The outer rind is yellow coloured, but there is considerable variability according to how the outside of the cheese has been washed during maturation (generally with a combination involving crushed tomato, ash and/or olive oil).

Uses
There is a wide range of uses for the cheese, which varies according to local traditions and the season. The delicate flavour of a young pecorino Toscano can provide an excellent complement to salad-based starters. As the cheese matures and the flavour strengthens, it can be eaten with honey or jam, as well as with fresh vegetables or fruits (especially pears and figs). Well matured pecorino toscano is widely used across Italy as an alternative to parmesan for grating over a wide range of dishes, especially pastas or soups.

See also
List of cheeses
List of Italian cheeses
List of Italian PDO cheeses

References

Cuisine of Tuscany
Italian cheeses
Sheep's-milk cheeses
Italian products with protected designation of origin
Cheeses with designation of origin protected in the European Union